Sir Rupert Turner Havelock Clarke, 2nd Baronet (1865–1926), 2nd Baronet of Rupertswood, pastoralist and entrepreneur, member of parliament and company director. He was the son of Sir William John Clarke. Sir William was made a baronet by Queen Victoria for the huge sums he had given to various causes.

Succeeding to the baronetcy on his father's death in May 1897, Rupert followed him into the Legislative Council of Victoria as member for Southern Province, retaining the seat until 1904. Sir Rupert married Elsie Tucker, with whom he had a son, also Rupert, who would inherit the title.

References
 Clarke, Sir Rupert Turner Havelock (1865 - 1926) Biographical Entry - Australian Dictionary of Biography Online at www.adb.online.anu.edu.au Sir Rupert Turner Havelock Clarke - Australian Dictionary of Biography online

Select bibliography

 J. Smith (ed), Cyclopedia of Victoria, vols 1, 3 (Melb, 1903, 1905);
 H. H. Peck, Memoirs of a Stockman (Melb, 1942);
 L. G. Houston, Ministers of Water Supply in Victoria (Melb, 1965);
 R. Gibson, My Years in the Communist Party (Melb, 1966);
 P. M. Power, From These Descended (Kilmore, Vic, 1977);
 Tocsin, 28 Jan 1904; Weekly Times (Melbourne), 21 Aug 1909; Punch (Melbourne), 16 Apr 1914; Age (Melbourne), 14 Feb 1955;
 W. Howat, annals of the Clarke family (State Library of Victoria). More on the resources

1865 births
1926 deaths
Baronets in the Baronetage of the United Kingdom
British Army personnel of World War I
Members of the Victorian Legislative Council
Royal Army Service Corps officers
Clarke baronets
People from Sunbury, Victoria
Australian philanthropists
Australian people of English descent
Military personnel from Melbourne
Australian expatriates in Monaco